A quill is a writing tool made from a moulted flight feather (preferably a primary wing-feather) of a large bird. Quills were used for writing with ink before the invention of the dip pen, the metal-nibbed pen, the fountain pen, and, eventually, the ballpoint pen.

As with the earlier reed pen (and later dip pen), a quill has no internal ink reservoir and therefore needs to periodically be dipped into an inkwell during writing. The hand-cut goose quill is rarely used as a calligraphy tool anymore because many papers are now derived from wood pulp and would quickly wear a quill down. However, it is still the tool of choice for a few scribes who have noted that quills provide an unmatched sharp stroke as well as greater flexibility than a steel pen.

Description

The shaft of a flight feather is long and hollow, making it an obvious candidate for being crafted into a pen. The process of making a quill from a feather involves curing the shaft to harden it, then fashioning its tip into a nib using a pen knife or other small cutting tool.

A quill pen is in effect a hollow tube which has one closed end, and has one open end at which part of the tube wall extends into a sharp point and has in it a thin slit leading to this point.

The hollow shaft of the feather (the calamus) acts as an ink reservoir and ink flows to the tip through the slit by capillary action.

In a carefully prepared quill, the slit does not widen through wetting with ink and drying. It will retain its shape adequately, requiring only infrequent sharpening; it can be used repeatedly until there is little left of it.

Sources

The strongest quills come from the primary flight feathers discarded by birds during their annual moult. Although feathers from the left wing are supposedly favored by right-handed writers because the feather curves away from the sight line, over the back of the hand, the quill barrel is cut to six or seven inches in length so no such consideration of curvature or 'sight-line' is necessary. Additionally, writing with the left hand in the era in which the quill was popular was discouraged, and quills were never sold as left- and right-handed, only by their size and species.

Goose feathers are most commonly used; scarcer, more expensive swan feathers are used for larger lettering. Depending on availability and strength of the feather, as well as quality and characteristic of the line wanted by the writer, other feathers used for quill-pen making include those from the crow, eagle, owl, hawk, and turkey. Crow feathers were particularly useful as quills when fine work, such as accounting books, was required. Each bird could supply only about 10 to 12 good-quality quills.

On a true quill, the barbs are stripped off completely on the trailing edge. (The pinion for example only has significant barbs on one side of the barrel.) Later, a fashion developed for stripping partially and leaving a decorative top of a few barbs. The fancy, fully plumed quill is mostly a Hollywood invention and has little basis in reality. Most, if not all, manuscript illustrations of scribes show a quill devoid of decorative barbs, or at least mostly stripped.

Uses
Quill pens were used to write the vast majority of medieval manuscripts. Quill pens were also used to write Magna Carta and the Declaration of Independence. U.S. President Thomas Jefferson bred geese specially at Monticello to supply his tremendous need for quills.
Quill pens are still used today mainly by professional scribes and calligraphers.

Quills are also used as the plectrum material in string instruments, particularly the harpsichord.

From the 17th to 19th centuries the central tube of the quill was used as a priming tube (filled with gunpowder) for cannon fire.

History 

Quills were the primary writing instrument in the western world from the 6th to the 19th century. The best quills were usually made from goose, swan, and later turkey feathers. Quills went into decline after the invention of the metal pen, mass production beginning in Great Britain as early as 1822 by John Mitchell of Birmingham. In the Middle East and much of the Islamic world, quills were not used as writing implements. Only reed pens were used as writing implements.

Quill pens were the instrument of choice during the medieval era due to their compatibility with parchment and vellum. Before this the reed pen had been used, but a finer letter was achieved on animal skin using a cured quill. Other than written text, they were often used to create figures, decorations, and images on manuscripts, although many illuminators and painters preferred fine brushes for their work. The variety of different strokes in formal hands was accomplished by good penmanship as the tip was square cut and rigid, exactly as it is today with modern steel pens.

It was much later, in the 1600s, with the increased popularity of writing, especially in the copperplate script promoted by the many printed manuals available from the 'Writing Masters', that quills became more pointed and flexible.

Quills are denominated from the order in which they are fixed in the wing; the first is favoured by the expert calligrapher, the second and third quills being very satisfactory also, plus the pinion feather. Flags the 5th and 6th feathers are also used. No other feather on the wing would be considered suitable by a professional scribe.

Information can be obtained on the techniques of curing and cutting quills:

In order to harden a quill that is soft, thrust the barrel into hot ashes, stirring it till it is soft; then taking it out, press it almost flat upon your knees with the back of a penknife, and afterwards reduce it to a roundness with your fingers. If you have a number to harden, set water and alum over the fire; and while it is boiling put in a handful of quills, the barrels only, for a minute, and then lay them by.

An accurate account of the Victorian process by William Bishop, from researches with one of the last London quill dressers, is recorded in the Calligrapher's Handbook cited on this page.

As a symbol

From the 19th century in radical and socialist symbolism, quills have been used to symbolize clerks and intelligentsia. Some notable examples are the Radical Civic Union, the Czech National Social Party in combination with the hammer, symbol of the labour movement, or the Democratic Party of Socialists of Montenegro.

Quills appear on the seals of the United States Census Bureau and the Administrative Office of the United States Courts. They also appear in the coats of arms of several US Army Adjutant general units which focus on administrative duties.

Quills are on the coats of arms of a number of municipalities such as Bargfeld-Stegen in Germany and La Canonja in Spain.

Three books and a quill pen are the symbols of Saint Hilary of Poitiers.

Quill and pen knives
A quill knife was the original primary tool used for cutting and sharpening quills, known as "dressing".

Following the decline of the quill in the 1820s, after the introduction of the maintenance-free, mass-produced steel dip nib by John Mitchell, knives were still manufactured but became known as desk knives, stationery knives or latterly as the name stuck "pen" knives.

There is a small but significant difference between a pen knife and a quill knife, in that the quill knife has a blade that is flat on one side and convex on the other which facilitates the round cuts required to shape a quill.

A "pen" knife by contrast has two flat sides. This distinction is not recognised by modern traders, dealers or collectors, who define a quill knife as any small knife with a fixed or hinged blade, including such items as ornamental fruit knives.

Today
While quills are rarely used as writing instruments in the modern day, they are still being produced as specialty items, mostly for hobbyists. Such quills tend to have metal nibs or are sometimes even outfitted with a ballpoint pen inside to remove the need for a separate source of ink.

According to the Supreme Court Historical Society, 20 goose-quill pens, neatly crossed, are placed at the four counsel tables each day the U.S. Supreme Court is in session; "most lawyers appear before the Court only once, and gladly take the quills home as souvenirs." This has been done since the earliest sessions of the Court.

In the Jewish tradition quill pens, called kulmus, are used by scribes to write Torah Scrolls, Mezuzot, and Tefillin.

Music
Plectra for psalteries and lutes can be cut similarly to writing pens. The rachis, the portion of the stem between the barbs, not the calamus, of the primary flight feathers of birds of the Corvidae was preferred for harpsichords. In modern instruments, plastic is more common, but they are often still called "quills". The lesiba uses a quill attached to a string to produce sound.

See also
The spiny barbs of a porcupine
In a zoological context, a spine is a hard, needlelike anatomical structure.

References

External links

A brief history of writing instruments
Tutorial on Medieval method of creating quills 

Feathers
Writing implements
Poultry products